Pijnacker Zuid is a RandstadRail station located in Pijnacker, the Netherlands.

History

The RandstadRail station opened on 10 September 2006 for the RET Erasmuslijn metro service, currently line E. The station features 2 platforms, that are the same height as the train doors. 

In 2006 and 2007 the service was operated as a shuttle Rotterdam Hofplein - Nootdorp. The station lies in the very south of Pijnacker, near a new housing development, Klapwijk where there will be 3400 new homes.

Train services
The following services currently call at Pijnacker Zuid:

Bus services
These services depart from near the station, at the bus stop Ade on the N472, by the roundabout:

 171 (Pijnacker Centrum RR - Pijnacker South - Rodenrijs - Rotterdam Centraal NS) (operated by Qbuzz)
 176 (Pijnacker Centrum RR - Pijnacker South - Rodenrijs - Bergschenhoek - Hillegersberg - Rotterdam Alexander NS) (operated by Qbuzz)
 484 (Pijnacker Buurtbus - Pijnacker - Delft East)

Railway stations opened in 2006
RandstadRail stations
Pijnacker-Nootdorp